Antti Hynynen (born 30 May 1984) is a retired Finnish footballer. He last played for Finnish team Ilves of the Veikkausliiga and was the captain of the team.

Formerly known as forward or midfielder, he has played more regularly as a right back in last years. Hynynen is 5'11" tall and weighs 11 and a half stone.

He has previously played for Tampere United, FC Haka and KuPS. He also has a decent scoring record.

References
Guardian Football

1984 births
Living people
Footballers from Tampere
Finnish footballers
Finland under-21 international footballers
Veikkausliiga players
Tampere United players
FC Haka players
Kuopion Palloseura players
Association football midfielders